Clemens Vincent Rault (August 11, 1896 – January 29, 1989) was a rear admiral in the United States Navy and dean of the Georgetown University School of Dentistry. He served as the Chief of the United States Navy Dental Corps twice, from 1932 to 1933 and again from 1948 to 1950.

Early life and education
Clemens Vincent Rault was born in  New Orleans, Louisiana, on August 11, 1896, to Sophie (née Umbach) and Joseph Rault. He attended Spring Hill College in Mobile, Alabama, and received his DDS degree from Loyola University New Orleans in 1918.

Military career

Clemens Rault joined the United States Naval Reserve in December 1918, and transferred to active duty Dental Corps on April 24, 1919.  His assignments included Marine Expeditionary Forces in both Haiti and Shanghai, as well as positions onboard the USS Pittsburgh, USS Houston, USS Relief, USS Medusa and USS Maryland. He also was assigned to several shore positions, including duty as an instructor at the Naval Medical School. He completed his first of two tours as the Chief of the United States Navy Dental Corps in 1933.

In 1937, he was ordered to the Northwestern University Dental School to complete graduate work. He received a Master of Science in Dentistry (M.S.D) from the school the following year. Clemens Rault served in the United States during World War II, first in the New York Navy Yard, and then as the District Dental Officer in the Third Naval District. His final tours of duty were as the commander of the US Naval Dental School, Chief of the United States Navy Dental Corps, and as the Assistant Chief of the Bureau of Medicine and Surgery for Dentistry.

Along with Alfred W. Chandler and Spry O. Claytor, Clemens V. Rault was promoted to rear admiral in 1947, with the date being changed retroactively to be effective on the November 9, 1942. All three would serve as the Chief of the Dental Corps.

Clemens V. Rault retired from the United States Navy on July 1, 1950, after 31 years of naval service.

Post Military career
Clemens V. Rault became the dean of Georgetown University School of Dentistry in 1950, and retired from this position on January 1, 1966. He remained a member of several professional dental organizations including the American Dental Association, the American College of Dentists (he was elected Chairman of the organization's Washington section), the International Association of Dental Research, and the International College of Dentists. He also served as President of the American Association of Dental Schools, and was a member of Omicron Kappa Upsilon Society.

In addition to his military awards, Clemens V. Rault received several professional awards in light of his long career in dentistry. He was elected "Dentist of the Year" in 1964 by the District of Columbia Dental Society, received an honorary Doctor of Science degree from Georgetown University in 1959, and another honorary Doctor of Science from New Orleans' Loyola University in 1966. The American Cancer Society awarded him the first annual Harold W. Krogh Award for his efforts at controlling oral cancer. He received the William John Gies award from the American College of Dentists in 1975 for his professional achievements and contributions to dental practices.

Clemens V. Rault died of heart failure on January 29, 1989, at Hôtel-Dieu Hospital in New Orleans. He was interred at Greenwood Cemetery.

References

External links
Rault, Clemens Vincent, admiral in The American Catholic Who's Who, volume 14.
Audio from Dr. Rault's retirement from Georgetown University
Rault, Clemens V. on scopus.com

American dentists
United States Navy personnel of World War II
Military personnel from Louisiana
United States Navy rear admirals (upper half)
People from New Orleans
United States Navy personnel of World War I
1896 births
1989 deaths
American university and college faculty deans
Loyola University New Orleans alumni
Spring Hill College alumni
20th-century dentists
20th-century American academics